UDP glucuronosyltransferase 1 family, polypeptide A7 is a protein that in humans is encoded by the UGT1A7 gene.

This gene encodes a UDP-glucuronosyltransferase, an enzyme of the glucuronidation pathway that transforms small lipophilic molecules, such as steroids, bilirubin, hormones, and drugs, into water-soluble, excretable metabolites. This gene is part of a complex locus that encodes several UDP-glucuronosyltransferases. The locus includes thirteen unique alternate first exons followed by four common exons. Four of the alternate first exons are considered pseudogenes. Each of the remaining nine 5' exons may be spliced to the four common exons, resulting in nine proteins with different N-termini and identical C-termini. Each first exon encodes the substrate binding site, and is regulated by its own promoter. The enzyme encoded by this gene has moderate glucuronidase activity with phenols. [provided by RefSeq, Jul 2008].

References

Further reading